The Korea Hapkido Federation is the largest, wholly hapkido, governing body for the Korean martial art of hapkido in the world.  It is made up of predominantly Korean born students and instructors or those individuals who have directly trained in South Korea. This organization is based in Seoul, South Korea and its president is Oh Se-Lim.

Founder
Ji Han Jae was the founder of the original Korea Hapkido Association (Dae Han Hapkido Hyub Hoe) in 1965. The first president of the Dae Han Hapkido Hyub Hoe was Park Jong-Kyu who was Head of Security Forces for the South Korean president. Later Kim Woo Joong, president of the Dae Woo company was elected president of the KHA. These political connections greatly increased the association's power and influence. The prime movers in this organization were members of Ji's original 'Sung Moo Kwan'.

The KHA later grew into the Republic of Korea Hapkido Association (Dae Han Min Gook Hyub Hoe) with the merging of Ji han Jae's 'Dae Han Hapkido Hyub Hoe', Kim Moo-Hong's 'Han Gook Hapkido Hyub Hoe' (Korean Hapkido Association) and Myung Jae Nam's 'Han Gook Hapki Hoe' (Korean Hapki Association) in 1973. Choi Dae-Hoon was elected president of the association with Ji Han Jae serving as senior vice president.

By 1983, Oh, See Lim, with many of the original founding members of the association departing, renamed the association by the first organizational name used by Ji, the Dae Han Hapkido Hyub Hoe. With a new preferred English rendering, the new Korea Hapkido Federation was born.

Prominent members
A list of people who were or are prominent members of the Korea Hapkido Federation:
Michael Rhoades - Director of the Korea Hapkido Federation for the United States, Korea Hapkido Federation certified 8th Dan - St. Louis metro area, MO, USA Jin Jung Kwan/Jin Joong Kwan successor 9th Dan of Gm Kim Myung Yong                                                        
 Scott Yates - Shin Moo Hapkido 8th Dan, Korea Hapkido Federation 8th Dan, KHF USA Technical Director - Atco, NJ USA
Aleksandr Semyonov - Director for the Korea Hapkido Federation for Saint Petersburg, Russia Branch, 6 Dan              
 Michael Dunchok - Korea Hapkido Federation Certified 7th Dan - Irvine, California, U.S.A. (Kuk Sool Kwan)
 Igor Pereira dos Santos — Korea Hapkido Federation certified 4th Dan - POA, Rio Grande do Sul, Brazil (Kuk Sool Kwan)
 Holcombe Thomas — Korea Hapkido Federation certified 8th Dan - Springfield, VA, USA
 Lee Sung-Soo — Korea Hapkido Federation Certified 9th Dan - Australia
 Shin, Hang Shik — Dae Han Hapkido Federation Certified 9th Dan - Atlanta, GA, USA
 Seo, Min Su — Dae Han Hapkido Federation Certified 7th Dan - Atlanta, GA, USA
 Myung Kwang-Sik — President of the World Hapkido Federation
 Scott Shaw — Korea Hapkido Federation certified 7th Dan, California, USA
 Don Wilson - Jin Joong Kwan 5th Dan- Korea Hapkido Federation certified 5th Dan - Regina, SK, Canada
 Myung Jae Nam — Founding member (d. 1999) and founder of the International Hapkido Federation
 Julian Lim @ LTC (R) Dr. Alif Aiman Abdullah — Hapkido Sung Moo Kwan, President of Korean Martial Arts Asia Pacific (KOMA SEAPAC), Korea Hapkido Federation certified 7th Dan - Kuala Lumpur, MALAYSIA
 Lionel Yap — Korea Hapkido Federation certified 6th Dan & Hapkido Sung Moo Kwan - Kuala Lumpur, MALAYSIA
 Roy Ng — Korea Hapkido Federation certified 4th Dan & Hapkido Sung Moo Kwan - Kuala Lumpur, MALAYSIA
 Andrew Barnes — Korea Hapkido Federation Certified 4th Dan - Australia
 Nigel May — Korea Hapkido Federation certified 6th Dan AUSTRALIA & Hapkido Sung Moo Kwan
 John A. Johnson, Ph.D. — Korea Hapkido Federation certified 6th Dan 
 Son Tae-Soo — Korea Hapkido Federation certified 7th Dan - Philadelphia, PA, USA
 Konrad Spillmann — Korea Hapkido Federation certified 5th Dan - Gallatin TN, USA
 Kang Seok Lee — Korea Hapkido Federation certified 7th Dan - North Carolina, USA
 Woo — Korea Hapkido Federation certified 7th Dan - Springfield, VA, USA
 Reza Nobahari — Korea Hapkido Federation certified 7th Dan - Dubai, UAE
 Lee Kidong — Korea Hapkido Federation certified 8th Dan - Sacramento, CA, USA
 Shin Jae Hwan — Hapkido Federation certified 8th Dan - Auckland, New Zealand
 Morteza Payahoo — Korea Hapkido Federation, 6th Dan Qazvin, IRI
 Jorge Luna - Korea Hapkido Federation certified 4th Dan - Guadalajara, Mexico
 Gabriel Aburto - Korea Hapkido Federation certified 4th Dan - Chile Representative 
 Marcelo Ruhland - Korea Hapkido Federation certified 6th Dan - Brazil branch Director (Kuk Sool Kwan)
 Cesar Jesus Condoy Larico - Korea Hapkido Federation certified 2nd Dan Lima - Peru (Kuk Sool Kwan)

Recognized Kwans of the KHF
Bong Moo Kwan (GM IM Myung Sup, 8th Dan)
 Chun Do Kwan (GM YU Chun Hee, 8th Dan)
 Cheong Kyum Kwan (GM CHOI Suk Hwan)
 Chun Ji Kwan (GM KIM Byung Soo, 8th Dan)
 Da Mool Moo Kwan
 Dong Yi Kwan (GM KANG Tae Soo)
 Duk Moo Kwan (GM KIM Duk In, 9th Dan)
 Eul Ji Kwan (GM Lim Chon-Yun, 8th Dan)
 Hak Moo Kwan (GM LEE Yong Sik)
 Han Moo Kwan (GM SONG Young Ki, 9th Dan)
 Huek Choo Kwan (GM JIN Jong Moon, 9th Dan)
 Hyo Chun Kwan (GM YOO Dong Gu, 7th Dan)
 Jin Jung Kwan/Jin Joong Kwan (GM Michael Rhoades (Kim Tae Hun), 9th Dan)
 Jung Moo Kwan (GM JEONG Jae Ro, 9th Dan)
 In Moo Kwan (GM NA In Dong, 9th Dan)
 Kang Moo Kwan (GM CHUN Man Bae)
 Ki Moo Kwan (GM IM Hyun Yong)
 Ki Sim Kwan (GM SUH Kwang Won, 8th Dan)
 Koryo Chun Tong Moo Ye Won
 Kuh Ho Kwan (GM CHUN Won Il, 8th Dan)
 Kuk Sool Kwan (GM KIM Woo Tak)
 Kum Moo Kwan (GM JUNG Soon Sung, 8th Dan)
 Kun Moo Kwan (GM HAN Kyu Il, 8th Dan)
 Kwang Moo Kwan (GM NO Kwang Yul, 8th Dan)
 Kyung Mu Kwan (GM KIM Nam Jae, 9th Dan)
 Moo Moo Kwan (GM KIM Yong Man, 9th Dan)
 Moo Hak Kwan (GM LEE Sung Soo, 9th Dan)
 Pyung Moo Kwan
 Seon Gyo Gwan
 Se Sim Kwan (GM YOO Ki Hyun, 7th Dan)
 Se Sung Kwan (GM JUNG Ik Chul, 7th Dan)
 Soo Do Kwan (GM OH Jae Suk)
 Song Moo Kwan (GM PARK Song Il, 9th Dan)
 Song Won Kwan (GM JUNG Bong Ok, 8th Dan)
 Soong Moo Kwan (GM LEE Jung Moon)
 So Rim Kwan
 Sung Moo Kwan
 Tae Moo Kwan (GM JUNG Ki Chul, 8th Dan)
 Yun Bee Kwan (GM KIM Jung Soo)
 Han Yu Kwan (Gyeong min yu, 10th Dan)
 Yong Moo Kwan (GM LEE Dong Woo, 9th Dan)
 Yoo Sool Kwan (GM BYUN Young Dae)
 Yoo Sool Won (GM YOO Sang Ho, 9th Dan)
 Jung Sool kwan( GM Fabian Duque 7° Dan)
 Yoo Sung Kwan (GM KIM Nam Kyu)
 Yun Moo Kwan (GM LEE Ho Il, 8th Dan)
 Kidong Kwan (GM LEE Kidong, 8th Dan)
 Hapki Kwan (GM KRIVOKAPIC Boris, 7th Dan)
 Sisu Kwan (Master Rondy McKee)
 Stit Kwan (Master Dusan Konevic)
 Estudiantes Colombia Kwan ECK (MASTER Joann Alvarado, 5th Dan)

External links
Korea Hapkido Federation
Korea Hapkido Federation USA

See also
Korean martial arts

References 

1965 establishments in South Korea
Hapkido organizations
Organizations based in Seoul
Sports organizations established in 1965